The Bayside Canadian Railway is an extremely short railway in Bayside, New Brunswick, Canada. Its apparent sole purpose is to perform as a Canadian railway, to take advantage of a loophole in the Jones Act that would normally forbid the use of foreign-flagged vessels in shipping between two U.S. ports.

Usage 
Shipping companies Kloosterboer International and Alaska Reefer Management (both part of American Seafoods Group) ship frozen pollock from Dutch Harbor (Alaska), via the Panama Canal to the eastern United States. 
The Jones Act requires the use of U.S.-flagged vessels when shipping between two U.S. ports, but there is an exemption, the so-called third proviso, when part of the route is over Canadian rail lines.
However, in 2012, this practice had changed such that the fish was transferred to trucks in Bayside, the truck driving up a loading ramp onto one of two flatbed railcars. Then a tiny shunter locomotive pulled the cars to the other end of the railroad track, reversed and pushed the train back to the loading ramp after which the truck would drive off the ramp and then enter the US via Calais, Maine.

Court case 
On August 16, 2021, the U.S. Customs and Border Protection (CBP) gave American Seafoods notice of $350 million in penalties for alleged violations of the Jones Act. CBP claimed that the Bayside Canadian Railway is not a "through route" and that the proviso in the Jones Act therefore does not apply.

The company sued in federal court, arguing the penalties prevented them from delivering their product, interfering with the affordable supply of pollock for school lunches.  A judge allowed the current practice to continue awaiting litigation. However, it appears as if Kloosterboer switched to Russian imported fish by August 19, 2021.

Description 
The railway consists of a single track of about 70 metres (220 ft), two flatbed rail cars, one FTD Trackmobile railcar mover and a loading ramp.

A video on YouTube shows the entire return trip to take about 45 seconds.

References 

New Brunswick railways
Standard gauge railways in Canada